Stephen Glen Rexe (February 26, 1947 – November 12, 2013) was a Canadian professional ice hockey goaltender, the first-ever draft pick of the Pittsburgh Penguins of the National Hockey League (NHL) and second overall pick in the 1967 NHL Amateur Draft.

Biography
Rexe played junior hockey with the Ontario Major Junior A, Peterborough Petes. In 1967, Rexe was offered an contract by Penguins general manager, Jack Riley, at $7,500 for one season with a $7,500 signing bonus. Rather than sign with Pittsburgh, Rexe chose to join the Canadian national hockey team as an amateur where he competed internationally for Canada. At the 1968 Winter Olympics Rexe backed up Wayne Stephenson on the way to a Canadian bronze medal. Canada withdrew from official IIHF events in 1970 and the national team programme was suspended after they were refused permission to use semi-professional players at the world championship. Rexe spent the rest of his hockey career playing in minor hockey leagues without ever appearing in an NHL game.

Rexe was primarily a second and third string goaltender for the Canadian national team. He went on to play with the Ottawa Nationals, Belleville Mohawks, Belleville Quintes of the Ontario Hockey Association Senior League, Greensboro Generals of the Eastern Hockey League, the Springfield Kings of the American Hockey League (AHL), where he back-stopped the Kings to a Calder Cup title in 1975, the Springfield Indians also of the AHL, Napanee Comets and Lindsay Lancers of the OHA Sr. League, Binghamton Dusters of the North American Hockey League. He owned and coached the OPJHL Whitby Lawmen in the 1984–85 season.

Rexe resided in Belleville, Ontario with his wife Maureen and their four children. After hockey, Rexe worked in the import / export automobile industry. He died at his home in Belleville on Tuesday, November 12, 2013 at the age of 66.

In an interview with an Ottawa Sun reporter in April 2008, Rexe stated that he considered it an honour to have been the first-ever pick of the Pittsburgh Penguins, and would have been delighted if the Pens would have invited him to Pittsburgh to drop the first puck when they open their new arena.

References

External links

1947 births
2013 deaths
Canadian ice hockey goaltenders
Ice hockey people from Ontario
National Hockey League first-round draft picks
Peterborough Petes (ice hockey) players
Pittsburgh Penguins draft picks
Sportspeople from Peterborough, Ontario
Springfield Kings players
Springfield Indians players